A fluffy critter is a cocktail containing 2 shots of white rum, lime juice, lemonade and strawberry sauce.

Mix all ingredients in a highball glass. The contents can be altered according to taste. 

The fluffy critter was included in the 2018 Belize Tourism Board's (BTB) competition "Taste of Belize" classic rum cocktail section.

See also

 List of cocktails

References

Cocktails with rum
Cocktails with lime juice
Cocktails with lemonade